The 1974 Asian Men's Softball Championship was an international softball tournament which was held in Manila, Philippines.

Participants

References

Asian Men's Softball Championship
1974 in Philippine sport
International softball competitions hosted by the Philippines